Osteopelta praeceps is a species of small, deep water sea snail, a marine gastropod mollusk in the family Osteopeltidae.

Distribution
This marine species is endemic to New Zealand.

References

 Spencer, H.G., Marshall, B.A. & Willan, R.C. (2009). Checklist of New Zealand living Mollusca. Pp 196-219. in: Gordon, D.P. (ed.) New Zealand inventory of biodiversity. Volume one. Kingdom Animalia: Radiata, Lophotrochozoa, Deuterostomia. Canterbury University Press, Christchurch.

External links
 To Biodiversity Heritage Library (1 publication)
 To World Register of Marine Species

Osteopeltidae
Gastropods described in 1994